Stigmella sorbi is a moth of the family Nepticulidae. It is found in most of Europe (except Iceland, Portugal, Belgium, and the western part of the Balkan Peninsula), east to the eastern part of the Palearctic realm.

The wingspan is 6–7 mm. The thick erect hairs on the head vertex are ochreous-yellowish to fuscous. The collar is pale grey. Antennal eyecaps are whitish. The front wings are bronze-fuscous  with a broad somewhat shining whitish fascia beyond middle ; apical area beyond this is rather dark purplish-fuscous. Hindwings are light grey. Adults are on wing in May.

The larvae feed on Amelanchier, Cotoneaster simonsii, Malus domestica, Sorbus aucuparia and Sorbus intermedia. They mine the leaves of their host plant. The mine starts as a slender winding corridor, the second part of which is almost stuffed with frass. The corridor then widens into a blotch with dispersed frass. In large leaves this blotch may be almost circular. Normally, the midrib is not crossed, but the mine can occupy the major part of a leaflet. There are often several mines in a leaf.

References

External links
Fauna Europaea
bladmineerders.nl
Swedish moths
Stigmella sorbi images at  Consortium for the Barcode of Life
lepiforum.de

Nepticulidae
Moths of Europe
Moths of Asia
Moths described in 1861